The Commander-in-Chief, China was the admiral in command of what was usually known as the China Station, at once both a British Royal Navy naval formation and its admiral in command. It was created in 1865 and deactivated in 1941.

From 1831 to 1865, the East Indies Station and the China Station were a single command known as the East Indies and China Station. The China Station, established in 1865, had as its area of responsibility the coasts of China and its navigable rivers, the western part of the Pacific Ocean, and the waters around the Dutch East Indies. The navy often co-operated with British commercial interests in this area.

The formation had bases at Singapore (Singapore Naval Base), HMS Tamar (1865–1941 and 1945–1997) in Hong Kong and Wei Hai (at Liugong Island) (1898–1940). The China Station complement usually consisted of several older light cruisers and destroyers, and the Chinese rivers were patrolled by a flotilla of suitable, shallow-draught gunboats, referred to as "China gunboats". Ships on this station usually had a distinctive livery of white hull and superstructure and dark funnels.

Between the two world wars, the Insect class gunboats were mainly used in the Far East and they were present during the Japanese invasion of China. In 1937, on the Yangtze river, the Japanese attacked , firing on her from a shore battery. A U.S. gunboat,  was also attacked, by Japanese aircraft, and sunk. Ladybird sailed the 20 miles to the scene of the sinking, took on board some of the Panay survivors and took them to Shanghai. Scarab and Cricket were off Nanking in 1937 as the Japanese started to bomb the city.

In response to increased Japanese threats, the separate China Station was merged with the East Indies Station in December 1941 to form the Eastern Fleet.

Commanders-in-Chief, China

See also
List of Eastern Fleet ships
List of fleets and major commands of the Royal Navy

References

Commanders-in-chief of the Royal Navy
Military units and formations of the Royal Navy in World War I
Military units and formations of the Royal Navy in World War II
Military units and formations disestablished in 1941